Kustom is from the Gold Coast, Queensland and is a subsidiary of Australian surfing brand Billabong International and specializes in footwear for surfing, skateboarding, and snowboarding.

References

External links
 

Australian brands
Swimwear manufacturers
Skateboarding companies
Snowboarding companies
Surfwear brands
Companies based on the Gold Coast, Queensland
Shoe brands
Shoe companies of Australia
Clothing companies established in 2005
Corporate subsidiaries